Capitonides is an extinct piciform from the Middle Miocene of southern Germany. C. europaeus is the only species recorded for the genus. Carroll (1988) assigned the genus to family Capitonidae.

References

Piciformes
Neogene birds of Europe
Miocene birds
Fossil taxa described in 1969